Wanted – A Master is a 1936 American short film directed by Arthur J. Ornitz and Gunther von Fritsch. In 1936, at the 9th Academy Awards, it was nominated for an Academy Award for Best Short Subject (One-Reel).

Cast
 Pete Smith – Narrator / Voice of Dog (voice)

References

External links
 
 
 

1936 films
Films produced by Pete Smith (film producer)
American black-and-white films
Films directed by Arthur Ornitz
1930s English-language films